Wolffia arrhiza is a species of flowering plant known by the common names spotless watermeal and rootless duckweed, belonging to the Araceae, a family rich in water-loving species, such as Arum and Pistia. It is the smallest vascular plant on Earth. It is native to Europe, Africa, and parts of Asia, and it is present in other parts of the world as a naturalized species.

Description 
Wolffia arrhiza is an aquatic plant which grows in quiet water bodies such as ponds. The green part of the plant, the frond, is a sphere measuring about 1 mm wide, but with a flat top that floats at the water's surface. It has a few parallel rows of stomata. There is no root. The plant produces a minute flower fully equipped with one stamen and one pistil. It often multiplies by vegetative reproduction, however, with the rounded part budding off into a new individual. In cooler conditions the plant becomes dormant and sinks to the bed of the water body to overwinter as a turion. The plant is a mixotroph which can produce its own energy by photosynthesis or absorb it from the environment in the form of dissolved carbon.

Human uses 
This tiny plant is a nutritious food. Its green part is about 40% protein by dry weight and its turion is about 40% starch. It contains many amino acids important to the human diet, relatively large amounts of dietary minerals and trace elements such as calcium, magnesium, and zinc, and vitamin B. It has long been used as a cheap food source in Myanmar, Laos, and Thailand, where it is known as khai-nam ("eggs of the water").  The plant is prolific in its reproduction, growing in floating mats that can be harvested every 3 to 4 days; it has been shown to double its population in less than four days in vitro.

It is also useful as a form of agricultural and municipal water treatment. It is placed in effluent from black tiger shrimp farms to absorb and metabolize pollutants. The plants grow quickly and take up large amounts of nitrogen and phosphorus from the water. The plants that grow in the wastewater can then be used as feed for animals, such as carp, Nile tilapia, and chickens.

References

External links 

 Jepson Manual Treatment
 USDA Plants Profile

Lemnoideae
Freshwater plants
Phytoremediation plants